Thomas Schneeberger (born May 18, 1956) is an American former handball player who competed in the 1984 Summer Olympics.

Basketball
He played for the Air Force Falcons from season 1974-75 until 1977–78.

In 1978 he was honored as most valuable basketball player and academy's most valuable athlete.

He became a ninth round draft pick in 1978 NBA draft.

Be played with the team USA at the 1978 FIBA World Championship the received the 5th place.

He participated at the 1979 and 1981-83 World Military Championships.

Handball
In the year 1976 he and Bob Djokovich started a handball club at the USAFA and won 6 times the handball nationals.

From 1976 he was national player at the United States men's national handball team. At the Summer Olympics in 1984 was he scored 21 goals. He's biggest victories are the gold medal at the Pan American Games in 1987

References

External links
 Tom Schneeberger at College Basketball at Sports-Reference.com
 Tom Schneeberger at The Draft Review

1956 births
Living people
Air Force Falcons men's basketball players
Air Force Falcons team handball
American male handball players
American men's basketball players
Basketball players from Michigan
Denver Nuggets draft picks
Handball players at the 1984 Summer Olympics
Handball players at the 1987 Pan American Games
Olympic handball players of the United States
Pan American Games gold medalists for the United States
Pan American Games medalists in handball
Power forwards (basketball)
Sportspeople from Ann Arbor, Michigan
United States men's national basketball team players
Medalists at the 1987 Pan American Games
Military personnel from Michigan
1978 FIBA World Championship players